The Naturparkweg is a nature trail which links the five nature parks in the German state of Schleswig-Holstein. It runs from   
Eckernförde via Aschberg, Sehestedt, Westensee, Brammer, Aukrug, Brokstedt, Wiemersdorf, Fehrenbötel, Blunk, Bad Segeberg, Bad Oldesloe to the Lauenburg Lakes.

The trail is marked by a yellow arrow with a green border. Its total length is 117 kilometres.

External links 
 Wanderverband Norddeutschland

Protected areas of Schleswig-Holstein